Mark Ellis (born 27 September 1953) is a thriller writer from Swansea and former barrister and entrepreneur. He has attended Llandovery College and later studied law at St John's College, Cambridge. He co-founded 4Front Technologies in 1991 and in 2004 began writing full-time.

Bibliography

Frank Merlin series
 Princes Gate  (2011) 
 Stalin's Gold  (2014) 
 Merlin at War (2017)

References

External links
 

British crime fiction writers
21st-century Welsh novelists
Living people
Alumni of St John's College, Cambridge
British thriller writers
People from Swansea
1953 births